The mosque and tomb of Salar and Sangar al-Gawli (مسجد سلار وسنجر الجاولي) is located near the Ibn Tulun Mosque along Saliba Street in Medieval Cairo and is west of Madrasa of Sarghatmish. It contains the joint mausoleums of Sayf el-Din Salar and Alam el-Din Sangar el-Gawli, powerful Mamluk emirs in the early 14th-century in 1304. The latter built the complex which also contains a madrasa for the Shafi'i school of jurisprudence and khanqah for the Sufi community.

The structure has various noteworthy features. The ones that most catches the eye are the two juxtaposed jelly-mold domes over the tomb chambers of Salar and Sangar.

Within the Gawaliyya; named used by locals to describe both Tombs, there is a long, vaulted passage that leads to an unknown sheikh's tomb, which is said to have the oldest stone dome in Cairo. The chamber of Sangar on the right is better preserved than Salar's chamber next to it.

References

External links

Entry on Egyptopia website
Salar & Sangar Al Gawali Mosque Architectural review

Mamluk architecture in Egypt
Mausoleums in Egypt
Saliba Street
Medieval Cairo
Tourist attractions in Cairo
14th-century establishments in Africa